Leonid Grcev (born on 28. April 1951 in Skopje, FNR Yugoslavia) is an electrical engineer at Sts. Cyril and Methodius University in Skopje, North Macedonia.

Grcev was named a Fellow of the Institute of Electrical and Electronics Engineers (IEEE) in 2013 for his contributions to transient electromagnetic modeling of grounding systems.

References 

Fellow Members of the IEEE
Living people
Macedonian engineers
Year of birth missing (living people)